The 1999 Ballon d'Or, given to the best football player in Europe as judged by a panel of sports journalists from UEFA member countries, was awarded to Rivaldo on 21 December 1999.

Rankings

Additionally, 22 players were nominated but received no votes: Fabien Barthez, Dennis Bergkamp, Laurent Blanc, Gianluigi Buffon, Frank de Boer,  Marcel Desailly, Giovane Élber, Pep Guardiola,
Filippo Inzaghi, Patrick Kluivert, Paolo Maldini, Fernando Morientes, Hidetoshi Nakata, Emmanuel Petit, Gus Poyet, Oleksandr Shovkovskyi, Lilian Thuram, Sylvain Wiltord and Gianfranco Zola.

References

External links
 France Football Official Ballon d'Or page

1999
1999–2000 in European football